Joe Donchess (March 17, 1905 – January 30, 1977) was an American football player at the University of Pittsburgh. He was a consensus All-American at end while playing on the 1929 university's football team under head coach Jock Sutherland. In 1937 Joe became Assistant Chief Surgeon at U.S. Steel and then Chief Surgeon there in 1943, a position he held until his retirement in 1965. He was elected to the College Football Hall of Fame in 1979.

References

1905 births
1977 deaths
All-American college football players
American football ends
Pittsburgh Panthers football players
College Football Hall of Fame inductees